, also known as Bilingirl or Bilingirl Chika, is a Japanese YouTuber. Since 2011, Yoshida has been producing videos on YouTube where she gives casual English lessons to Japanese people. As of 2021, she has over 1.5 million subscribers on her YouTube channel.

Early life

Born in Nagasaki Prefecture, Japan, Yoshida moved to the United States when she was in her first year of elementary school due to her father's job transfer, and she grew up in Anacortes, Washington. She attended a Japanese school every week from elementary to high school, where she was classmates with actor Kei Hosogai. After graduating from high school, Yoshida enrolled at the University of Washington in 2003, where she majored in business and attended the Foster School of Business, and she graduated in 2007.  After spending 16 years in the United States, she moved back to Japan, where she worked as a business consultant for an American company at their Japanese branch. From 2010 to 2012, she briefly opened a nail salon in Ginza as a side business.

Career

In 2011, Yoshida posted her first video on her YouTube channel,  to teach English grammar to her friend, who had asked her to look over her English resume. After posting more English lessons, her channel began attracting a following, and after 1.5 years, she decided to focus on her YouTube career full-time after receiving job inquiries from several companies. Several clients that Yoshida has worked with include Austrian Airlines and Kao Corporation. Since opening her channel, Yoshida has gained 1.5 million subscribers as of 2021.

In 2014, Yoshida opened a second YouTube channel, Japanagos, which features educational videos about Japan to her overseas viewers. In the same year, she appeared in a commercial for YouTube.

In 2018, NHK broadcast a television program that named Yoshida as the 5th favorite YouTuber in Japan. In the same year, she launched a mobile app called "Help Me Travel", which teaches English phrases to Japanese people when traveling abroad.

In April 2020, Yoshida took a hiatus from her channel following criticisms of her decision to return to Japan from Malaysia at the height of the COVID-19 pandemic. She resumed posting videos on August 13, 2020.

Personal life

On October 18, 2015, Yoshida announced that she was getting married. In June 2018, she gave birth to a daughter, nicknamed . On October 19, 2021, she announced that she had given birth to a son.

Publications

References

English-language YouTube channels
Japanese-language YouTube channels
Japanese YouTubers
Video bloggers
University of Washington Foster School of Business alumni
YouTube vloggers
People from Nagasaki Prefecture
1984 births
Living people
People from Anacortes, Washington
Japanese expatriates in Malaysia
Japanese emigrants to the United States